During the 2003–04 English football season, Charlton Athletic competed in the FA Premier League.

Season summary
For the third season running, a late slump in form ended Charlton Athletic's hopes of European qualification. In 2001–02, they had finished 14th after failing to win any of their final 10 games. In 2002–03, they had finished 12th after a not-quite-so dramatic slump. 2003–04, however, did bring Charlton's best Premiership finish to date, as well as their highest league finish since the 1950s, as they came seventh. For much of the season, they had occupied the Champions League and UEFA Cup places, but the familiar end-of-season setback pushed them out of the European places.

At the end of the season, goalkeeper Dean Kiely was named the club's Player of the Year.

Final league table

Players

First-team squad
Squad at end of season

Left club during season

Reserve squad

Transfers

In
  Matt Holland  –  Ipswich Town, 16 June, £1,050,000
  Simon Royce –  Leicester City, 26 June, free
  Paolo Di Canio –  West Ham United, 11 August, free
  Sérgio Leite –  Boavista, 14 August, free
  Stephen Hughes-  Watford, 14 August, free
  Carlton Cole –  Chelsea, 20 August, season-long loan
  Chris Perry –  Tottenham Hotspur, 28 November, £100,000
  Jerome Thomas –  Arsenal, 2 February, £100,000

Out
  John Robinson –  Cardiff City, 10 July, free
  Mathias Svensson –  Norwich City, 19 December, undisclosed
  Scott Parker –  Chelsea, 30 January, £10,000,000
  Tahar El Khalej – retired
  Ben Roberts –  Brighton & Hove Albion
 Transfers in:  £1,250,000
 Transfers out:  £10,000,000

Loan out
  Chris Bart-Williams –  Ipswich Town, loan

Statistics

Appearances and goals

|-
! colspan=14 style=background:#dcdcdc; text-align:center| Goalkeepers

|-
! colspan=14 style=background:#dcdcdc; text-align:center| Defenders

|-
! colspan=14 style=background:#dcdcdc; text-align:center| Midfielders

|-
! colspan=14 style=background:#dcdcdc; text-align:center| Forwards

|-
! colspan=14 style=background:#dcdcdc; text-align:center| Players transferred out during the season

Premier League
Results are courtesy of Statto.

Results per matchday 

 

 Charlton 1–2 Aston Villa
 Charlton 1–1 Portsmouth

FA Cup
 3 January: Gillingham 3–2 Charlton Athletic

League Cup
 23 September: Charlton Athletic 4–4 Luton Town aet (Charlton win on penalties)
 29 October: Everton 1–0 Charlton Athletic

Notes

References

Charlton Athletic F.C. seasons
Charlton Athletic